Sheat Manor is a manor house in Chillerton, on the Isle of Wight, England. Considered to be one of the island's antiquities, Sheat manor house, is a fine old gabled mansion now used as a farmhouse. It has a pond and swans. It contains some interesting Jacobite carving. Sheat was one of the few properties whose Anglo-Saxon owner, Alaric, was not disturbed by the Norman invasion. It was run by the Urry family for some time.

References
 This article includes text incorporated from Hampshire Field Club and Archaeological Society's "Proceedings, Volume 2 (1894)", a publication now in the public domain.
 This article includes text incorporated from Henry Irwin Jenkinson's "Jenkinson's practical guide to the Isle of Wight (1876)", a publication now in the public domain.

Manor houses in England
Country houses on the Isle of Wight
Grade II* listed buildings on the Isle of Wight